The Larkana Bulls was a limited overs cricket team based in Larkana, Sindh, Pakistan. The team was established in 2013-14.

Squad
Squad of Larkana Bulls:

Shahid Afridi (C)
Zahid Mehmood
Ahsan Ali
Shahnawaz Dahani
Carlos Brathwite
Imran Tahir
Ayaz Jamali
Ghulam Yasin
Imran Chandio
Imtiaz Ali
Mohammad Siddiq
Mohammad Urs
Mohammad Waqas
Nasrullah Memon
Noor Din
Rameez Ahmed
Shabbir Ahmed 
Azam Khan (WK)

Result summary

T20 results

Captains' record

Sponsor
2013-14 kit sponsors of the Larkana Bulls team was Mughal Steel.

See also
 Pakistan Super League

References

External links
Twenty 20 Record page for Larkana

Cricket clubs established in 2013
2013 establishments in Pakistan
Cricket teams in Pakistan
Bulls
Cricket in Sindh